Endennasaurus is an extinct genus of thalattosaurian from the Upper Triassic of Italy. It was found in and named after the Endenna cave, composed of Zorzino Limestone in Lombardia.

Gallery

References 

Thalattosaurs
Late Triassic reptiles of Europe
Fossils of Italy
Fossil taxa described in 1984
Prehistoric reptile genera